Luigia Cattaneo-Gentile, also known as A Noblewoman from Genoa is a portrait painting by the Flemish Baroque painter Anthony van Dyck. It is on display in the Musée des Beaux-Arts of Strasbourg, France. Its inventory number is 200.

The portrait was most likely painted in 1622, during Van Dyck's lengthy stay in Genoa, where he became the official portraitist of the members of the Genoese aristocracy. Luigia Cattaneo-Gentile was bought from the Durazzo family by Wilhelm von Bode in 1890 and was long thought to represent a marchesa from the House of Durazzo. The identification with the House of Cattaneo-Gentile instead, while already hypothesized in 1890, was only confirmed in 1986 by the Van Dyck specialist, Susan J. Barnes.

From 1929 to 1965, the painting was attributed to Peter Paul Rubens, which was testament to its superior pictorial qualities, until the Rubens specialist Justus Müller-Hofstede determined that it was definitely an early masterpiece by a young Anthony van Dyck.

References

External links 

Portrait d’une noble Génoise, Luigia Cattaneo-Gentile , presentation on the museum's website

Portraits by Anthony van Dyck
1620s paintings
Paintings in the collection of the Musée des Beaux-Arts de Strasbourg